Elections to Aberdeenshire Council election took place on Thursday 5 May 2022, on the same day as the 31 other Scottish local government elections. The election used the 19 wards created under the Local Governance (Scotland) Act 2004, with 70 councillors being elected. Each ward elected either three or four councillors, using the STV electoral system.

The Conservatives were again returned as the largest party on the council, however they again fell short of an overall majority, winning 26 councillors on a reduced vote share. This represents an increase of 3 compared to 2017, although this was chiefly due to not standing enough candidates in 2017, leading to 3 candidates achieving double their required quota and several others coming close. The Scottish National Party (SNP) remained in second place with no net change in total seats, leaving them with 21 seats on an increased vote share from 2017. The Liberal Democrats also recorded no change in councillors, returning 14, on a slightly higher vote share than in 2017. Labour and the Greens lost their only seats on the council and the number of independent councillors returned decreased by one despite the number of votes being cast for these candidates increasing slightly.

Background

Previous election

Source:

Composition
Since the previous election, several changes in the composition of the council occurred. Most were changes to the political affiliation of councillors including Conservative councillors Colin Pike, Jim Gifford, Lesley Berry, Jeff Hutchison, Mike Roy and Dianne Beagrie; SNP councillor Geva Blackett and Labour councillor Alison Evison, who resigned from their respective parties to become independents. Conservative councillors Sebastian Leslie and Robbie Withey were suspended from the party over unpaid council tax and assault allegations, respectively.

Conservative councillor Sandy Wallace who resigned from the party and initially became an independent before defecting to the Libertarian Party. Independent councillor Iain Sutherland joined the Conservatives and SNP councillors Alastair Bews and Leigh Wilson resigned from the party and initially became an independent before defecting to the Alba Party. SNP councillor Brian Topping also defected to the Alba Party. Four by-elections were held and resulted in a Conservative hold, an SNP hold, a Conservative gain from the Lib Dems and a Conservative gain from the SNP.

Retiring councillors

Results

Note: Votes are the first preference votes. The net gain/loss and percentage changes relate to the result of the previous Scottish local elections on 4 May 2017. This may differ from other published sources showing gain/loss relative to seats held at dissolution of Scotland's councils.

Ward summary

|- class="unsortable" align="centre"
!rowspan=2 align="left"|Ward
!% 
!Cllrs
!%
!Cllrs
!%
!Cllrs
!%
!Cllrs
!%
!Cllrs
!%
!Cllrs
!%
!Cllrs
!rowspan=2|TotalCllrs
|- class="unsortable" align="center"
!colspan=2 bgcolor=""|Conservative
!colspan=2 bgcolor=""|SNP
!colspan=2 bgcolor=""|Lib Dem
!colspan=2 bgcolor=""|Labour
!colspan=2 bgcolor=""|Green
!colspan=2 bgcolor=""|Ind
!colspan=2 bgcolor="white"|Others
|-
|align="left"|Banff and District
|27.80
|1
|bgcolor="#efe146"|31.88
|bgcolor="#efe146"|1
|3.78
|0
|5.04
|0
|2.65
|0
|27.02
|1
|1.84
|0
|3
|-
|align="left"|Troup
|bgcolor="#add8e6"|50.20
|bgcolor="#add8e6"|2
|37.26
|1
|8.47
|0
|colspan="2" 
|4.07
|0
|colspan="4" 
|3
|-
|align="left"|Fraserburgh and District
|32.45
|1
|20.01
|1
|4.85
|1
|colspan="4" 
|bgcolor="#c0c0c0"|35.96
|bgcolor="#c0c0c0"|1
|6.74
|0
|4
|-
|align="left"|Central Buchan
|bgcolor="#add8e6"|33.28
|bgcolor="#add8e6"|1
|31.11
|2
|13.03
|1
|4.57
|0
|2.90
|0
|11.32
|0
|3.78
|0
|4
|-
|align="left"|Peterhead North and Rattray
|26.71
|1
|29.10
|1
|3.71
|0
|colspan="4" 
|bgcolor="#c0c0c0"|38.12
|bgcolor="#c0c0c0"|2
|2.36
|0
|4
|-
|align="left"|Peterhead South and Cruden
|41.33
|1
|bgcolor="#efe146"|46.48
|bgcolor="#efe146"|1
|12.19
|1
|colspan="8" 
|3
|-
|align="left"|Turriff and District
|bgcolor="#add8e6"|39.09
|bgcolor="#add8e6"|2
|33.93
|1
|23.46
|1
|colspan="2" 
|3.52
|0
|colspan="4" 
|4
|-
|align="left"|Mid-Formartine
|33.27
|1
|bgcolor="#efe146"|33.67
|bgcolor="#efe146"|1
|14.90
|1
|colspan="4" 
|18.15
|1
|colspan="2" 
|4
|-
|align="left"|Ellon and District
|bgcolor="#add8e6"|35.64
|bgcolor="#add8e6"|2
|31.67
|1
|21.96
|1
|6.34
|0
|4.39
|0
|colspan="4" 
|4
|-
|align="left"|West Garioch
|27.14
|1
|bgcolor="#efe146"|29.43
|bgcolor="#efe146"|1
|12.72
|1
|7.65
|0
|4.30
|0
|17.09
|0
|1.68
|0
|3
|-
|align="left"|Inverurie and District
|25.68
|1
|bgcolor="#efe146"|31.05
|bgcolor="#efe146"|1
|16.97
|1
|colspan="2" 
|3.76
|0
|22.54
|1
|colspan="2" 
|4
|-
|align="left"|East Garioch
|27.43
|1
|bgcolor="#efe146"|40.97
|bgcolor="#efe146"|1
|9.44
|1
|7.66
|0
|colspan="2" 
|14.50
|1
|colspan="2" 
|4
|-
|align="left"|Westhill and District
|bgcolor="#add8e6"|39.60
|bgcolor="#add8e6"|2
|25.06
|1
|26.25
|1
|7.61
|0
|colspan="4" 
|1.47
|0
|4
|-
|align="left"|Huntly, Strathbogie and Howe of Alford
|bgcolor="#add8e6"|40.44
|bgcolor="#add8e6"|2
|34.52
|1
|13.91
|1
|7.83
|0
|colspan="2" 
|2.70
|0
|0.60
|0
|4
|-
|align="left"|Aboyne, Upper Deeside and Donside
|bgcolor="#add8e6"|34.48
|bgcolor="#add8e6"|1
|21.67
|1
|17.48
|0
|3.70
|0
|colspan="2" 
|22.68
|1
|colspan="2" 
|3
|-
|align="left"|Banchory and Mid-Deeside
|bgcolor="#add8e6"|42.69
|bgcolor="#add8e6"|1
|23.97
|1
|21.52
|1
|11.09
|0
|colspan="4" 
|0.72
|0
|3
|-
|align="left"|North Kincardine
|26.93
|1
|bgcolor="#efe146"|36.12
|bgcolor="#efe146"|2
|15.52
|1
|colspan="2" 
|5.73
|0
|14.28
|0
|1.37
|0
|4
|-
|align="left"|Stonehaven and Lower Deeside
|bgcolor="#add8e6"|31.97
|bgcolor="#add8e6"|2
|27.11
|1
|22.72
|1
|6.89
|0
|3.11
|0
|8.31
|0
|colspan="2" 
|4
|-
|align="left"|Mearns
|bgcolor="#add8e6"|31.75
|bgcolor="#add8e6"|2
|29.00
|1
|6.52
|0
|5.81
|0
|3.36
|0
|20.94
|1
|2.61
|0
|4
|- class="unsortable" class="sortbottom"
!align="left"|Total
!35.3
!26
!29.8
!21
!15.3
!14
!4.3
!0
!2.1
!0
!12.0
!9
!1.2
!0
!70
|}

Ward results

Banff and District

 2017: 1 x SNP, 1 x Independent, 1 x Conservative
 2022: 1 x SNP, 1 x Independent, 1 x Conservative
 2017-2022 Change: No change

Troup

 2017: 1 x SNP, 1 x Independent, 1 x Conservative
 2022: 2 x Conservative, 1 x SNP
 2017-2022 Change: +1 Conservative, -1 Independent

Fraserburgh and District

 2017: 2 x SNP, 1 x Conservative, 1 x Independent
 2022: 1 x SNP, 1 x Conservative, 1 x Independent, 1 x Liberal Democrat
 2017-2022 Change: -1 SNP, +1 Liberal Democrat

Central Buchan

 2017: 1 x SNP, 1 x Conservative, 1 x Liberal Democrat, 1 x Independent
 2022: 2 x SNP, 1 x Conservative, 1 x Liberal Democrat
 2017-2022 Change: 1 x SNP gain from Independent

Peterhead North and Rattray

 2017: 2 x Independent, 1 x SNP, 1 x Conservative
 2022: 2 x Independent, 1 x SNP, 1 x Conservative
 2017-2022 Change: No Change

Peterhead South and Cruden

 2017: 1 x SNP, 1 x Conservative, 1 x Independent
 2022: 1 x SNP, 1 x Conservative, 1 x Liberal Democrat
 2017-2022 Change: 1 x Liberal Democrat gain from Independent

Turriff and District

 2017: 1 x SNP, 1 x Conservative, 1 x Liberal Democrat, 1 x Independent
 2022: 2 x Conservative, 1 x SNP, 1 x Liberal Democrat
 2017-2022 Change: 1 x Conservative gain from Independent

Mid-Formartine

 2017: 1 x SNP, 1 x Conservative, 1 x Liberal Democrat, 1 x Independent
 2022: 1 x SNP, 1 x Conservative, 1 x Liberal Democrat, 1 x Independent
 2017-2022 Change: No Change

Ellon and District

 2017: 2 x SNP, 1 x Conservative, 1 x Liberal Democrat
 2022: 2 x Conservative, 1 x SNP, 1 x Liberal Democrat
 2017-2022 Change: 1 x Conservative gain from SNP

West Garioch

 2017: 1 x SNP, 1 x Liberal Democrat, 1 x Conservative
 2022: 1 x SNP, 1 x Liberal Democrat, 1 x Conservative
 2017-2022 Change: No Change

Inverurie and District

 2017: 1 x SNP, 1 x Conservative, 1 x Liberal Democrat, 1 x Independent
 2022: 1 x SNP, 1 x Conservative, 1 x Liberal Democrat, 1 x Independent
 2017-2022 Change: No Change

East Garioch

 2017: 1 x SNP, 1 x Green, 1 x Liberal Democrat, 1 x Conservative
 2022: 1 x SNP,  1 x Conservative, 1 x Liberal Democrat, 1 x Independent
 2017-2022 Change: 1 x Independent gain from Green

Westhill and District

 2017: 2 x Conservative, 1 x SNP, 1 x Liberal Democrat
 2022: 2 x Conservative, 1 x SNP, 1 x Liberal Democrat
 2017-2022 Change: No Change

Huntly, Strathbogie and Howe of Alford

 2017: 2 x Conservative, 1 x SNP, 1 x Liberal Democrat
 2022: 2 x Conservative, 1 x SNP, 1 x Liberal Democrat
 2017-2022 Change: No Change

Aboyne, Upper Deeside and Donside

 2017: 1 x Conservative, 1 x SNP, 1 x Liberal Democrat
 2022: 1 x Conservative, 1 x SNP, 1 x Independent
 2017-2022 Change: 1 x Independent gain from Liberal Democrat

Banchory and Mid-Deeside
 2017: 1 x Conservative, 1 x SNP, 1 x Liberal Democrat
 2022: 1 x Conservative, 1 x SNP, 1 x Liberal Democrat
 2017-2022 Change: No Change

North Kincardine

 2017: 1 x SNP, 1 x Labour, 1 x Conservative, 1 x Liberal Democrat
 2022: 2 x SNP, 1 x Conservative, 1 x Liberal Democrat
 2017-2022 Change: 1 x SNP gain from Labour

Stonehaven and Lower Deeside
 2017: 2 x Conservative, 1 x SNP, 1 x Liberal Democrat
 2022: 2 x Conservative, 1 x SNP, 1 x Liberal Democrat
 2017-2022 Change: No Change

Mearns

 2017: 2 x Conservative, 1 x SNP, 1 x Liberal Democrat
 2022: 2 x Conservative, 1 x SNP, 1 x Independent
 2017-2022 Change: 1 x Independent gain from Liberal Democrat

Aftermath
On 18 May 2022, a coalition deal was announced between the Conservatives, Liberal Democrats, and seven aligned independents to form the council administration. The following day, as part of the deal, councillor Mark Findlater, Conservative councillor for the Troup ward, was appointed Council Leader, with Councillor Anne Stirling from the Liberal Democrats becoming Depute Leader, and Independent councillor Judy Whyte was named Provost.

Notes

References

Aberdeenshire
Aberdeenshire Council elections